Justine Henin-Hardenne was the defending champion, but did not compete this year.

Alicia Molik won the title by defeating Maria Sharapova 4–6, 6–2, 6–3 in the final.

Seeds
The top four seeds received a bye into the second round.

Draw

Finals

Top half

Bottom half

References
 Official results archive (ITF)
 Official results archive (WTA)

2004 Singles
Swisscom Challenge - Singles